Deborah "Debbi" A. Lawrence (née Spino, born October 15, 1961, in Columbus, Indiana) is a retired female racewalker from the United States. She set her personal best in the women's 10 km race walk event (45:03) at the 1995 World Championships in Athletics in Göteborg, Sweden.

Personal bests
10 km: 44:42 min –  1992
20 km: 1:33:48 hrs –  Sacramento, California, 16 July 2000

Achievements

Personal life
She is a vegetarian and affirms that her success as an athlete is due in a large part to a vegetarian diet.

References

External links

1961 births
Living people
American female racewalkers
Athletes (track and field) at the 1991 Pan American Games
Athletes (track and field) at the 1992 Summer Olympics
Athletes (track and field) at the 1996 Summer Olympics
Athletes (track and field) at the 2000 Summer Olympics
Olympic track and field athletes of the United States
Pan American Games medalists in athletics (track and field)
Pan American Games silver medalists for the United States
People from Columbus, Indiana
Track and field athletes from Indiana
Competitors at the 1998 Goodwill Games
Medalists at the 1991 Pan American Games
21st-century American women